YSWX-TV, branded as Canal 12 is a Salvadoran television station owned by Red Salvadoreña de Medios. The station was founded by Jorge Emilio Zedán on 15 December 1982. Since its affiliation to the Albavisión media network, its greatest success has been the strengthening of its information system and the transmission of international sports content.

History

Creation and early years 

YSWX began broadcasting on 15 December 1982 and used the slogan "The Salvadoran signal". Its first owner was Félix Castillo Mayorga. The station had strong relations with Guatemala's Canal 3 from Guatemala and was a competitor of Telecorporación Salvadoreña. The musical theme of the station was interpreted in marimba and was called "Allí te nació la patria" (There you were born the fatherland). YSWX was born with the ideal of being a competitive station different from the ones existing at that time, mainly those of Telecorporacion Salvadoreña. The first president of the station was Julio Rank who was in charge of maintaining this ideal through canned programs of American production which were distributed in musical programs, TV series and movies.

The first facilities of YSWX were located on Avenida Las Acacias in Colonia San Benito, in a residential house that was conditioned to function as a television station. Regrettably, Mr. Castillo died in a plane crash a year later, with Canal 12 acquired by Jorge Emilio Zedán and his family, who continued the project with a similar vision of competing against TCS. His first executives were Julio Rank (General Manager), Orlando Lorenzana (Sales Manager), Alexander Amaya (production manager) and Óscar Romeo Guzmán (maintenance engineer).

In September 1985, the national production began at the facilities of the Colonia San Benito. Under the direction of Narciso Castillo.

The first germ of news coverage was made up of text strips that were passed at 7:00 p.m. and at 8:00 p.m. with a summary of the news of the day with ticker sound. When the murder of the US Marines happened In the so-called "Zona Rosa", on Wednesday, 19 June 1985, the channel still did not have a press team or a news space, but the success of that coverage by the study staff caused a few months later that the Friday, 13 September 1985, the news space known as "Al Día" (today "Noticiero Facts") was opened, which was characterized by an impartial coverage of the news, creating a very good reception in the audience.

The first director of the Press section was the Chilean Narciso Castillo. A few months after starting this news space, YSWX was acquired by the Zedán family, thus beginning the second stage of its history.

Some entrepreneurs linked to the Christian Democracy and Salvadoran journalists advised by journalists and experts of Chilean nationality created a company called "Salvadoreña de Televisión" with which they bought two channels of Channel 12: one aimed at transmitting news, which is where "News to the Day" (today "Noticiero Hechos") with its three broadcasts and two months later the morning stripe is created under the name of "Good Morning" (today "Hola El Salvador") which consisted of a news broadcast, an interview with depth with Salvador Castellanos and later created a space dedicated to address problems of the community that was called "Community a day" of 1 hour. The idea of transmitting canned American programming is replaced by national production where the development of national talent was sought and in addition, professional, democratic and pluralistic television.

The slogans of "La Señal Salvadoreña (The Salvadoran Sign)" and "Porque lo hacemos aquí (because do it here)" began with the new programming of the station, with programs such as "Telepirata", "Tierra de infancia", "El show del tío Memo y la tía Bubu" and the main ones that were "Noticiero al día" and "Buenos Días".

In 1985, under the leadership of the Salvadoran-Palestinian businessman, Jorge Emilio Zedán (1935–2012), YSWX began a second phase of its history, breaking with the traditional schemes of Salvadoran television, with its advertising phrase Canal 12 dares to occupy a place in the minds of Salvadorans, especially from the news, because as expressed in his second slogan, he dared to present content in a way that had never been seen before in the country. Through its Newsletter and the large number of programs that were produced in their studios, totaling some 24 programs that had to be produced for the weekly program, so their motto changed to "Lo Hacemos Aquí (We do it here)". A few months after starting the Zedán stage, its facilities were moved to another large residential house located on Avenida las Magnolias, always in Colonia San Benito, which was also conditioned to operate as a television station, having to be built two Studios and a theater for live programs with audience. It was more than 25 years ago when in the middle of the Civil War in El Salvador, where a group of journalists began the task of forming a channel where the backbone of it is the information of national events at that crucial and transcendent moment of Salvadoran history.

That is how on 13 September 1985, the "Noticiero Al Día" went on the air, which since its inception was placed in the highest audience in its nightly broadcast, since, Teleprensa, was still broadcasting its stellar edition at noon. This caused channel 12 to become a strong competitor for channels 2, 4 and 6, which are from Telecorporación Salvadoreña. It was here, from the Noticiero Al Día, and later the Interview Al Día; from where Jorge Emilio Zedán sponsors Mauricio Funes, who questioned the government's actions, denounced the abuses and exercised impartial journalism (something unthinkable at that time in Salvadoran society). This earned Jorge Zedán many pressures, to which the businessman never gave up. Some attribute to this rebellious behavior the power, its kidnapping; from which, after the payment of a high ransom, he was released.

The sponsorship and protection of a successful entrepreneur such as Jorge Emilio Zedán, to the career of journalist Mauricio Funes, paid off. Not only did Canal 12 become the country's alternative voice, which earned him many awards and recognitions to Jorge Emilio Zedán (such as the Maria Moors Cabot journalism prize or the appointment as El Salvador's Meritísimo Son), but years later (a few years before dying), Jorge Emilio Zedán saw his sponsored and protected, Mauricio Funes, become the President of the Republic of El Salvador.

"Noticias al Día" and "Buenos Días" begin to monopolize the audience and channel advertising. From the news point of view, "Noticiero al día" receives more commercial rating, therefore it becomes the channel's most important space. Due to this phenomenon, economic growth is sought and Canal 12 shares are sold to businessman Félix Mayorga Rivas, who in turn sells them to businessman Jorge Emilio Zedán in November 1986.

In March 1987, Channel 12 undergoes the first one of its crises since when Jorge Emilio Zedán buys most of the actions of the channel, it begins to realize a series of changes in the structure of this. One of the most notable changes is the removal from office of some of the directors; the resignation of Julio Rank, the Sales and Production Director of that time is requested. (Narciso Castillo continued to head "Noticiero al día"). With Julio Rank, more than 30 employees of the channel decide to resign and support him in a new news project. This same year that Mauricio Funes becomes part of Channel 12.

Channel 12 marks a stage in the history of Salvadoran television in 1988 to be the first (and to date the only one in history) channel to transmit 24 hours a day.

In the middle of May 1992, Narciso Castillo leaves the direction of the Noticiero to the day and decides to found another television channel -Megavision El Salvador- and with him, more than 45 people renounce their positions and organize themselves to found this channel. Several journalists and presenters disappear from the screen of Channel 12

The new generation 
In May 1996 a strategic alliance was signed with the second most important Mexican television station: TV Azteca. As a result of this alliance, on Wednesday, 1 January 1997, TV Azteca acquired 75 percent of the shares of Canal 12 and became the majority shareholder, in partnership with Jorge Emilio Zedán and the Salvadoran-Palestinian entrepreneur, Armando Bukele Kattán. With this change, Channel 12 becomes TV Doce and Noticiero a Día is now called Noticiero Hechos, still a reference of Salvadoran television.

The changes that were made within the new administration, allowed TV Doce to have the capacity to cover the entire country with a 100% digital signal - under the American standard ATSC and from 2017 under the Japanese-Brazilian standard SBTVD or ISDB-Tb -, resulting in a high quality image for viewers. TV Doce was one of the first channels to achieve this quality leadership in Central America.

In September 1999, TV Doce became the first Salvadoran channel capable of reporting on the People's Republic of China, and in November 2000 it was the only Salvadoran media outlet that conducted an exclusive interview with Cuban leader Fidel Castro.

In December 2003, the channel began to form part of the company As Media based in Puebla de Zaragoza, Mexico, as As Media acquired the shares of TV Azteca de Puebla. With this change, TV Doce would be renamed Canal 12 and would stop transmitting 24 hours. It currently broadcasts from Monday to Thursday from 5:30 a.m. to 11:59 p.m., Friday from 5:30 a.m. to 12:59 a.m. and weekends. from 6:00 a.m. to 11:59 p.m. As Media remained the owner of Canal 12 between December 2003 and May 2015

In May 2015, according to some digital media, the channel was allegedly acquired by the Guatemalan-Mexican-American media multinational Albavisión, this information was already confirmed by the new authorities of the channel (except for the then director of the channel, the Mexican Jorge Carbajo, since he had not been removed from his post when he bought the channel) in November 2015 in an important space of opinion broadcast on a radio station belonging to an allied but foreign chain of which the channel belongs.

On Tuesday, 19 January 2016, the acquisition of the channel by Albavisión was officially confirmed, since on that day newspapers published in major newspapers and on social networks published articles informing that on Monday, 18 January, the company was founded the Red Salvadoreña de Medios (RSM), the holding that the channel belongs to since then, this information can also be checked on the official Albavisión website.

Logos 

 1982–1985: The first logo was a number 12 in golden color similar to the Uruguayan channel Teledoce.
 1985–1987: The second logo was similar to the previous logo, the number 12 was separated with the same golden texture; Behind the number, it had twelve blue bars symbolizing as the channel numbering.
 1987–1997: The third logo was similar to the previous logos, using its different font as much as the same texture. Below the number 12, the slogan of Channel 12 comes out saying "A Big Channel" in Helvetica Bold typography.
 1997–2003: The fourth logo consisted of a green 1 and a 2 in red and blue and a yellow dot, and below put TV DOCE in Times New Roman typography, hinting at the colors of the TV Azteca's logo.
 2003–2010 The fifth logo was a semicircle of water color and says channel 12 of black text. This was the first change under the direction of As Media.
 2010–2013: The sixth logo of channel 12 was a black and white blue disc, referring to the flag of El Salvador and the white color says 12 and the slogan phrase of Channel 12 "Enciende Tu Tele (Turn on your TV)".
 2013–2018: The seventh logo was the same color disc of the flag of El Salvador and white says 12 but more stylized and with the slogan "El Doce va con vos (The 12 goes with you!)" used from March 2013 to July 2018
 2018–present: The eighth logo is modernized. It consists of a black disk with blue edges and puts 12 in white, but keeping the slogan "Va con vos (Goes with you!)". This is the first change under the direction of Albavisión.

References 

1984 establishments in El Salvador
Spanish-language television stations
Television stations in El Salvador
Television channels and stations established in 1984